Sanayea District is one of eight districts located in Bong County, Liberia.

References
 Statoids.com

Districts of Liberia
Bong County